Michael B. Druxman (born February 23, 1941) is a screenwriter, active primarily in the 1990s. His scripts for B-movie producer Roger Corman include Cheyenne Warrior (1994) with Kelly Preston, Dillinger and Capone (1995) starring Martin Sheen and F. Murray Abraham and The Doorway (2000) with Roy Scheider, which he also directed.

Druxman is also the author of one-person plays, Lombard and Jolson.

Additionally, he is the author several non-fiction works about Hollywood, its movies and the people who make them, including Basil Rathbone: His Life and His Films, The Art of Storytelling: How To Write A Story... Any Story, Make It Again, Sam: A Survey of Movie Remakes, Miss Dinah Shore, plus the novels, Nobody Drowns in Mineral Lake, Shadow Watcher, Murder in Babylon, Jackie Goes to Dixie, and Dark Chasm.

His memoirs, My Forty-Five Years in Hollywood and How I Escaped Alive, were published in August 2010, by Bear Manor Media.

References

External links
Official website

Themysteryreader.com
Variety.com
Britannica.com
Journalgazette.net

1941 births
Living people
American male novelists
20th-century American dramatists and playwrights
American male screenwriters
American male dramatists and playwrights
20th-century American male writers
Screenwriting instructors
Writers of books about writing fiction